= Piavitsa mine =

Manganese mine in Central Macedonia, Greece

- Location: Central Macedonia, Greece
- Products: Manganese

The Piavitsa mine is a mine located in the north of Greece in Central Macedonia. Piavitsa represents one of the largest manganese reserve in Greece having estimated reserves of 10.5 million tonnes of manganese ore grading 34% manganese metal.
